King Arthur is a legendary king of the Britons.

King Arthur may also refer to:

Fiction and literature
Le Morte d'Arthur, 15th-century work of Sir Thomas Malory
King Arthur: An Heroick Poem in Twelve Books, a 1697 poem by Richard Blackmore
King Arthur (DC Comics), a version of Arthur in DC Comics
King Arthur (Marvel Comics), a version of Arthur in Marvel Comics
 King Arthur The Seven Deadly Sins (2014 TV series), a version of Arthur in The Seven Deadly Sins
Morlock Night by K. W. Jeter, King Arthur and Merlin appear as England's saviors.

Film and television
 King Arthur: Legend of the Sword, a 2017 film by Guy Ritchie
 King Arthur (2004 film), a film by Antoine Fuqua
 Mr. Merlin,  a TV Series 1981–1982
 Excalibur, a 1981 film by John Boorman
 King Arthur (TV series), a 1979 Japanese TV series
 Monty Python and the Holy Grail, a 1975 film by Terry Gilliam

Games
 King Arthur (video game), a 2004 game based on the film
 King Arthur: The Role-playing Wargame, a 2009 role-playing game
 King Arthur (board wargame), a 1979 game
 King Arthur, or Saber, a character in Fate/stay night

Music
 King Arthur (opera), a 1691 opera by John Dryden and Henry Purcell
 King Arthur, or The British Worthy, a 1770 composition by Thomas Arne, including revisions from Dryden's work
 King Arthur, a 1937 composition by Benjamin Britten
"King Arthur", or "Arthur", a 1975 recording by Rick Wakeman from The Myths and Legends of King Arthur and the Knights of the Round Table
"King Arthur", a 1986 song by Valerie Dore
"King Arthur", a 1994 song by Mark Spiro from Care of My Soul Vol. 1
King Arthur, a 2004 compilation album by Medwyn Goodall

Other uses
 King Arthur (tree), a giant sequoia in Sequoia National Park, California, US
 King Arthur Flour, an American milling company founded in 1790
 King Arthur class, or LSWR N15 class, a class of steam locomotives named after Arthurian characters
 Arthur, Prince of Wales (1486–1502), would have become "King Arthur of England" if he had not died before his father

See also
Arthur King (disambiguation)
Arthur Pendragon (disambiguation)
Arthur (disambiguation)